Applegate is an English surname. Notable people with the surname include:

 A.J. Applegate, American pornographic actress
 Andrew J. Applegate (1833–1870), American politician
 Celia Applegate, American historian
 Christina Applegate (born 1971), American actress
 Colleen Applegate, American actress known as Shauna Grant
 Dan Applegate, American engineer
 David Applegate, American computer scientist
 Debby Applegate (born 1968), American historian and biographer
 Dick Applegate, British army general
 Douglas Applegate (born 1928), American politician
 Eddie Applegate (born 1935), American actor
 Fred Applegate (1879–1968), American baseball player
 Fred Applegate (actor) (born 1953), American actor, singer and dancer
 James L. Applegate (1931–2006), American politician
 Jesse Applegate (1811–1888), American pioneer
 Jessica-Jane Applegate (born 1996), British swimmer
 Jodi Applegate (born 1964), American news anchor
 John Stilwell Applegate (1837–1916), American politician, lawyer and writer
 Joseph R. Applegate (1925–2003), American linguist
 K. A. Applegate (born 1956), American author
 Lindsay Applegate (1808–1892), American pioneer
 Oliver Cromwell Applegate (1845–1938), American politician
 Red Applegate (1921–1965), American boxer
 Rex Applegate (1914–1998), American military close combat instructor in World War II
 Royce D. Applegate (1939–2003), American actor and screenwriter
 Shannon Applegate, American historian

References 

English-language surnames